The Chateau St. Louis in Quebec City was the official residence of the French Governor of New France and later the British Governor of Quebec, the Governor-General of British North America, and the Lieutenant-Governor of Lower Canada.

The site was designated a National Historic Site of Canada in 2002.

First chateau
The first chateau was built under the direction of Governor Charles Huault de Montmagny in 1648 but by the 1680s it was in a state of disrepair.

Second chateau
 
Construction of a replacement on the same site began in 1694 under Governor General Louis de Buade de Frontenac.  Frontenac died there in 1698.  A new pavilion and two new wings were added from 1719 to 1723 by Gaspard-Joseph Chaussegros de Léry.

The building was then severely damaged during the Siege of Quebec in 1759, after which time it passed into British hands.

The house was gradually rebuilt in sections over the next forty years.  In the meantime the governors split their time between the St. Louis and a new building, called the New Chateau or Chateau Haldimand after governor Haldimand.

The St. Louis was destroyed by fire in January 1834.  Afterward it was replaced by a series of terraces.

The site of the New Chateau is now occupied by the Chateau Frontenac hotel, which is named after Governor Frontenac.

During the 1830s the governor and his family also used a summer home in Sorel and the Chateau de Ramezay in Montreal.

Today
Between 2005 and 2007, a series of digs under the Dufferin Terrasse revealed over 500,000 artifacts and ruins of the forts and château. In 2008, for Quebec city 400th anniversary, the remains of Saint-Louis Forts and Châteaux were opened as a Historic Site to the public under the management of Parks Canada.

References

External links
 

New France
Government Houses in Canada
Demolished buildings and structures in Canada
1834 disestablishments in Lower Canada
Houses in Quebec City
Burned buildings and structures in Canada
French colonial architecture in Canada
Rebuilt buildings and structures in Canada
Castles in Canada
Ruins in Canada